Abdullah Morad (Arabic:عبد الله مراد) (born 8 May 1990) is an Emirati footballer who plays as a forward, most recently for Al-Dhaid.

External links

References

Emirati footballers
1990 births
Living people
Al Shabab Al Arabi Club Dubai players
Hatta Club players
Al-Ittihad Kalba SC players
Al Dhaid SC players
Association football forwards
UAE First Division League players
UAE Pro League players